Coulanges may refer to the following:

Individuals:
 Numa Denis Fustel de Coulanges, French historian

Places in France:

 Coulanges, Allier, a commune in the department of Allier
 Coulanges, Loir-et-Cher, a commune in the department of Loir-et-Cher
 Coulanges-la-Vineuse, a commune in the department of Yonne
 Coulanges-sur-Yonne, a commune in the department of Yonne
 Coulanges-lès-Nevers, a commune in the department of Nièvre